Pegomya is a genus of flies within the family Anthomyiidae. Some species are considered pests due to their leafmining larvae. Species include:

P. agarici Griffiths, 1984
P. aldrichi Griffiths, 1983
P. alticola (Huckett, 1939)
P. amargosana Griffiths, 1982
P. aninotata (Huckett, 1939)
P. atlanis (Huckett, 1939)
P. betae (Curtis, 1847) — beet leafminer
P. bicolor (Wiedemann, 1817)
P. bifurcata Griffiths, 1983
P. caesia (Stein, 1906)
P. calyptrata (Zetterstedt, 1846)
P. carduorum (Huckett, 1939)
P. cedrica (Huckett, 1939)
P. circumpolaris Ackland and Griffiths, 1983
P. cognata (Stein, 1920)
P. collomiae Griffiths, 1982
P. constricta Griffiths, 1982
P. convergens (Huckett, 1939)
P. crassiforceps Griffiths, 1983
P. cygnicollina Griffiths, 1971
P. defecta Huckett, 1966
P. depressiventris (Zetterstedt, 1845)
P. dissidens Huckett, 1966
P. disticha Griffiths, 1983
P. dorsimaculata (Wulp, 1896)
P. elongata (Wulp, 1896)
P. flaviantennata Griffiths, 1984
P. flavifrons (Walker, 1849)
P. flaviventris Griffiths, 1983
P. flavoscutellata (Zetterstedt, 1838)
P. fumipennis (Huckett, 1939)
P. furva (Ringdahl, 1938)
P. geniculata (Bouche, 1834)
P. gilva Zetterstedt, 1846
P. gilvoides Griffiths, 1983
P. glabra (Stein, 1920)
P. haemorrhoum (Zetterstedt, 1938)
P. hirticauda Huckett, 1966
P. holmgreni (Boheman, 1858)
P. holosteae (Hering, 1924)
P. hyoscyami (Panzer, 1809) — spinach leafminer
P. icterica (Holmgren, 1872)
P. incisiva (Stein, 1906)
P. indicta (Huckett, 1939)
P. kodiakana Huckett, 1965
P. macalpinei Griffiths, 1983
P. macrophthalma Griffiths, 1984
P. maculata (Stein, 1906)
P. magdalenensis Griffiths, 1982
P. minuta (Malloch, 1918)
P. nagendrai Suwa, 1983
P. neomexicana Griffiths, 1983
P. nigra Suwa, 1974
P. notabilis (Zetterstedt, 1846)
P. pallidoscutellata (Zetterstedt, 1852)
P. petasitae Griffiths, 1982
P. pribilofensis Huckett, 1965
P. pseudobicolor Griffiths, 1982
P. quadralis Huckett, 1965
P. remissa Huckett, 1965
P. rubivora (Coquillett, 1879) — raspberry cane maggot
P. rubrivaria Huckett, 1967
P. rufescens (Stein, 1898)
P. ruficeps (Zetterstedt, 1838)
P. rufina (Fallén, 1825)
P. rugulosa (Zetterstedt, 1845)
P. sagehenensis Huckett, 1967
P. saximontana Griffiths, 1983
P. scapularis (Zetterstedt, 1846)
P. setaria (Meigen, 1826)
P. setibasis Huckett, 1965
P. sharmaii Suwa, 1983
P. silvicola Huckett, 1966
P. simplex Griffiths, 1982
P. sociella (Stein, 1906)
P. sombrina Huckett, 1966
P. stagnalis Griffiths, 1982
P. striata (Stein, 1920)
P. tabida (Meigen, 1826)
P. tenera (Zetterstedt, 1838)
P. terminalis (Rondani, 1866)
P. tinctisquama (Huckett, 1939)
P. transgressa (Zetterstedt, 1846)
P. umbripennis Huckett, 1966
P. unicolor (Stein, 1898)
P. utahensis Griffiths, 1982
P. valgenovensis Hennig, 1973
P. variegata (Huckett, 1939)
P. ventralis (Stein, 1906)
P. versicolor (Meigen, 1826)
P. vicaria (Huckett, 1939)
P. vittigera (Zetterstedt, 1838)
P. winthemi (Meigen, 1826)
P. wygodzinskyi (Albuquerque, 1954)
P. zonata (Zetterstedt, 1838)

References

Anthomyiidae
Articles containing video clips
Muscoidea genera
Taxa named by Jean-Baptiste Robineau-Desvoidy